BB15 may refer to:

Big Brother 15 (disambiguation), a television program in various versions 
, a United States Navy battleship